Connah's Quay railway station was a railway station located to the north of Connah's Quay, Flintshire, Wales on the south bank of the canalised section of the River Dee.

History
Opened on 1 September 1870 as part of the Chester and Holyhead Railway (now the North Wales Coast Line), the station had two platforms linked by a footbridge. The down platform contained the two storey station building where the ticket office and waiting rooms were located. The opposite platform had only a basic waiting shelter. From its opening day to 1904 it formed a terminus of the Wrexham, Mold and Connah's Quay Railway.

One incident of note in the station's history occurred just before it closed down. On 29 August 1965 a diesel unit train caught fire, injuring nine passengers and the three crew members. Goods services were halted on 1 November 1952 and the station was closed fully on 14 February 1966.

References

Further reading

Disused railway stations in Flintshire
Former London and North Western Railway stations
Railway stations in Great Britain opened in 1870
Railway stations in Great Britain closed in 1966
Beeching closures in Wales